Mateo Túnez Grau (born 21 November 1989 in Navarrés, Valencia, Spain) is a motorcycle road racer. He won the Spanish 125cc Championship in 2005.

Career statistics

Grand Prix motorcycle racing

By season

Races by year
(key) (Races in bold indicate pole position, races in italics indicate fastest lap)

References

External links

1989 births
Living people
Spanish motorcycle racers
People from Canal de Navarrés
Sportspeople from the Province of Valencia
125cc World Championship riders